Ebonette Deigaeruk (born 2 November 1983) is a Nauruan weightlifter.

Deigaeruk competed at the 2002 Commonwealth Games where she won bronze medals in the 48kg snatch, 48kg clean and jerk and 48kg total events. She was four time Oceania Weightlifting Championships champion at women's 48 kg event (1999, 2000, 2002 and 2003).

References

1983 births
Living people
Nauruan female weightlifters
Weightlifters at the 2002 Commonwealth Games
Commonwealth Games bronze medallists for Nauru
Commonwealth Games medallists in weightlifting
Medallists at the 2002 Commonwealth Games